This is a list of famous cats which achieved some degree of popularity either in their own right or by association with someone famous.

Before the modern era
 Nedjem or Nojem (Egyptian: nḏm "Sweet One" or "Sweetie"), 15th century BC. The cat of Puimre, second priest of Amun during the reign of Queen Hatshepsut. Depicted on a damaged relief from Puimre's tomb, Nedjem is the earliest known cat to bear an individual name.
Pangur Bán (Old Irish "White Pangur"; the meaning of the latter word is unclear), 8th-9th century AD. The cat of an otherwise unknown Irish monk, who wrote a poem cataloguing the similarities between the cat's character and his own.
 Ta-Miu (Egyptian: tꜣ mjw "She-Cat"), 14th century BC. The cat of Crown Prince Thutmose, mummified after her death and buried in a decorated sarcophagus in Prince Thutmose's own tomb following his own early demise.
 Muezza, 7th century AD. The (possibly apocryphal) cat of the Islamic prophet Muhammad.

Famous in own right

Space flight
Félicette, the only cat ever launched into space. Launched by the French Centre d'Enseignement et de Recherches de Médecine Aéronautique (CERMA) on 18 October, 1963, Félicette was recovered alive after a 15-minute flight and a descent by parachute. Félicette had electrodes implanted into her brain, and the recorded neural impulses were transmitted back to Earth.

In politics

Canada
Tuxedo Stan, a cat who ran for mayor of Halifax, Nova Scotia.

New Zealand

Governor Grey, a Burmese cat that lives in Old Government House on Auckland University campus since 2012

Mittens, a Turkish Angora cat who used to roam the streets of central Wellington, especially in Te Aro, before his relocation to Auckland

Paddles, New Zealand's "First Cat", a polydactyl cat that belonged to Prime Minister Jacinda Ardern

Russia
Barsik, a cat who ran for mayor of Barnaul, Russia. In 2016, Barsik announced his bid to become Russia's president in 2018.

Taiwan
Think Think and Ah Tsai, who belong to Tsai Ing-wen, the President of Taiwan.

United Kingdom

Catmando, joint leader of the Official Monster Raving Loony Party from 1999 to 2002
Freya, Chief Mouser to the Cabinet Office for a brief period in 2012–2014, performing the role jointly with Larry
Gladstone, Chief Mouser of HM Treasury at Whitehall in London since 2016
Hamish McHamish (1999 – 11 September 2014), a long-haired ginger cat that was adopted by the citizens of the town of St Andrews, Fife, Scotland and has had a statue built in his honour. Something of a local feline celebrity with tourists and students, he became famous after the publication of a book titled "Hamish McHamish: Cool Cat About Town". In 2013, a bronze statue was crowd funded in his honour, unveiled in April 2014.
Humphrey, Chief Mouser to the Cabinet Office 1989–97, named for the character of Sir Humphrey Appleby in Yes Minister.
Larry, Chief Mouser to the Cabinet Office since February 2011
Palmerston, Chief Mouser of Foreign & Commonwealth Office since April 2016
Peta, Chief Mouser to the Cabinet Office beginning in 1964; serving under three Prime Ministers
Peter, Chief Mouser to the Cabinet Office 1929–1946; serving under five prime ministers, and three monarchs.
 Sybil, Chief Mouser to the Cabinet Office for a brief period in 2007 to 2009
Wilberforce, Chief Mouser to the Cabinet Office under four British Prime Ministers

United States

 India "Willie" Bush, US President George W. Bush's cat, named for Rubén Sierra "El Indio".
 Misty Malarky Ying Yang, a Siamese belonging to Amy Carter and former pet of former U.S. President Jimmy Carter.
Puffins, US President Woodrow Wilson's cat.
 Socks Clinton, a stray cat adopted by the family of President Bill Clinton, named by his daughter Chelsea.
Shan, a Siamese cat who belonged to US President Gerald Ford's daughter, Susan.
 Tabby and Dixie, Abraham Lincoln's cats. Lincoln once remarked that Dixie "is smarter than my whole cabinet." 
 Tiger and Blacky, US President Calvin Coolidge's cats when he and his family lived in the White House. Coolidge was known for hiding the cats about the house, prior to and during his presidency, leaving his wife, Grace Coolidge, to find and rescue them.
Hank the Cat, a Maine Coon that ran for Senate in the commonwealth of Virginia in the 2012 US elections. He finished in third place behind winner Democrat Tim Kaine.
Mayor Stubbs, a cat who was honorary mayor of the town of Talkeetna, Alaska from 1997 until his death in 2017
Sweet Tart, a 9-year-old tabby, was elected to a three-year term as Mayor of the town of Omena, Michigan in July 2018. Sweet Tart prevailed over a field that included another cat, 13 dogs, a goat, a peacock, and a chicken. Two dogs, Diablo Shapiro and Punkin Anderson-Harden, were elected Vice-Mayor and Second Vice-Mayor respectively.
Willow Biden, US President Joe Biden and First Lady Jill Biden's cat

Ukraine
 Ambassador, the main mouser of the Ministry of Foreign Affairs of Ukraine in Kyiv since 2017.

On the Internet 

Big Floppa, or simply Floppa, is an internet meme based around a Russian caracal cat named Gosha.
Bilbo the Cat (UK), a Twitter influencer recognised by the Scottish Parliament.
Bingus, a sphynx cat, originally attracted attention on Instagram in March 2020. Bingus quickly became a popular internet meme, especially among fans of the YouTuber Corpse Husband.
FamousNiki (Russia, real name Niki), an Internet celebrity known for his humanlike behavior, facial expression and passion to pose for photo and video.
Grumpy Cat (US, real name Tardar Sauce), an Internet celebrity known for her grumpy facial expression; died in 2019.
Henri, le Chat Noir, an internet film noir "existentialist" cat.
Jorts and Jean, cats in a viral 2021 Reddit post who became organized labor advocates on Twitter.
Kebab Shop Cat (UK), the cat of comedy writer Thom Phipps, whose tweet about it visiting the local kebab shop went viral after it was copied by VICE writer Sam Kriss to his account.
Keyboard Cat (US), an internet celebrity.
Kittisaurus cat family (South Korea), also known as the Cream Heroes, is a YouTube channel portraying the life of ten cats: ChuChu, Coco, DD, LaLa, LuLu, MoMo, TT, NaNa, ToTo, and DoDo; and their human companion, Claire. They can be seen in various situations of domestic life and visits to the vet are also reported, as it intends to spread awareness and share information on the achondroplasia disease which affects LuLu, as well as TT's issues with kidneys due to her poor drinking habits. LuLu is the cat portrayed in both famous Internet memes "Oh Lawd He Comin'" and "The Roman Empire (a lion) and Italy (LuLu)".
Lil Bub (US), star of Lil Bub & Friendz.
Longcat (2002–2020, Japan, also known as Nobiko), an Internet meme, known for her long torso.
Maru (Japan), internet celebrity famous for his love of boxes.
Messi, a pet cougar who became popular on Instagram and YouTube in 2018
N2 (2000–2014), a "talking cat" who appeared on Animal Planet's My Pet's Gone Viral on 31 March 2013.
Nala Cat, a slightly cross-eyed Siamese-tabby mix. With 4.3 million followers on Instagram and her own brand of cat food, her value was estimated to be $100 million in 2022, making her the richest cat in the world at that time.
Phoenix, who survived burns from an air raid during the 2022 Russian Invasion of Ukraine and became an icon of Ukrainian resilience for the war effort.
Smudge, also known as "Table Cat", who became part of the woman yelling at a cat Internet meme in 2019. The meme consisted of a screencap of a woman pointing angrily from The Real Housewives of Beverly Hills paired with a picture of Smudge at a dining table, seemingly looking confused. Smudge has since amassed a large Internet following, with over 1.4 million followers on Instagram.
Sockington (US), a cat famous for his posts on Twitter.
Stepan, a Ukrainian cat with more than one and a half million followers on Twitter and Instagram.
Tara (US), a family cat from Bakersfield, California, who saved a four-year-old boy from a dog attack in 2014, and became a "viral Internet sensation" when household surveillance footage was published.
Thurston Waffles, a white cat known for his distinctive, screaming meows, which became a renowned meme and gained popularity in 2019. He died on 8 September 2022 from nasal cancer.
Zoe the Cat, PhD, a cat accredited by the American Psychotherapy Association, as part of a commentary about the state of accreditation within the industry by Dr. Steve Eichel.

In film and television 
Morris the Cat, the advertising mascot for 9Lives brand cat food.
Orangey, a cat featured in Breakfast at Tiffany's and other movies.
Palmer the Cat, acts the part of Leo Kohlmeyer in the movie The Richest Cat in the World.
Tsim Tung Brother Cream, was a cat who lived in a convenience store in Hong Kong. He has appeared in a book, and in advertising and on TV programs.

In literature 

Bob, a ginger cat that was found injured and subsequently adopted by London busker, James Bowen, in 2007. Bob's and Bowen's adventures together on the streets of London became the subject of a book, published in March 2012, A Street Cat Named Bob: How One Man And His Cat Found Hope On The Streets.
Casper, (1997 – 14 January 2010) a male domestic cat famous for travelling on a No. 3 bus in Plymouth, and inspired the book, Casper the Commuting Cat.
Cleo (1982 - c2006), a black cat owned by author Helen Brown and her son Sam. Cleo featured in Brown’s best selling novel Cleo.
Dewey Readmore Books, the library cat from Spencer, Iowa. Born Nov 1987; abandoned at the Library in Jan 1988; died (euthanized) December 2006. Subject of a best-selling book, Dewey: The Small-Town Library Cat Who Touched the World
Garfield, a ginger Tom famous for his visits at the local Sainsbury's supermarket in Ely, England. His adventures are chronicled on his Facebook page, and fictionalized in his own book of short stories.
Henrietta, the now-deceased cat of New York Times foreign correspondent Christopher S. Wren, made famous by the book, The Cat Who Covered the World ( in one printing).
Hodge, Dr. Samuel Johnson's favourite cat, famously recorded in James Boswell's Life of Johnson, as shedding light on his owner's character.
Jeoffry, the visionary poet Christopher Smart's cat, who is praised as "surpassing in beauty" in his owner's poem "Jubilate Agno". (Jeoffry was Smart's only companion during his confinement in an asylum in 1762–63.) The Jeoffry extract is set as a treble solo in the festival cantata, Rejoice in the Lamb Op 30, by Benjamin Britten.
Tao, male seal-point Siamese; inspiration for a main character in the 1961 novel, The Incredible Journey.

World record holders 
Blackie, a cat that inherited 15 million British Pounds and thus became the richest cat in history.
Colonel Meow, a Himalayan-Persian mix who became famous on social media websites for his extremely long fur and scowling face. As of 2014, he holds the Guinness world record for longest hair on a cat (nine inches). Died 2014.
Creme Puff, the world's oldest cat (1967–2005). Owned by Jake Perry.
Himmy from Cairns, Australia the fattest cat on record who weighed 21.3 kg (46.8 lbs) at his death in 1986.
Prince Chunk, a shorthair cat alleged to weigh forty-four pounds (two pounds short of the world record).
Smokey, the holder of the Guinness World Record for "Loudest purr by a domestic cat".
Stewie, Guinness World Record holder for world's longest domestic cat from August 2010 until his death 4 February 2013.
 Tiffany Two, the oldest living feline, aged 27 years, per Guinness World Records.
Towser "The Mouser" (1963–1987) of Glenturret Distillery in Crieff, Scotland, holds the Guinness World Record for the most mice caught (28,899).
Cygnus, the cat with the longest tail (17.5 inches).
Arcturus, the tallest cat (20.1 inches).

On ships

Mrs Chippy of Endurance, cat on the Ernest Shackleton expedition.
Simon, celebrated ship's cat of HMS Amethyst. In addition to being presented with multiple medals, he was the only cat to have won the PDSA's Dickin Medal, for his rat-catching and morale-boosting activities during the Yangtze Incident in 1949. He also received the rank of "Able Seacat".
Trim of HMS Reliance, and HMS Investigator, the first cat to circumnavigate Australia. Companion of Matthew Flinders.
All three ships were torpedoed, but Sam survived each sinking and retired to a home on dry land. The most famous mascot of the British Royal Navy.

Railways 
 Dirt (2008–2023), official greeter and mascot of the Nevada Northern Railway Museum in Ely, Nevada, USA. Born under one of the museum's steam locomotives, Dirt was raised by the museum staff. His popularity went viral in 2019 after photos of the "Shop Cat" were posted online by professional photographer Steve Crise. Featured in The Washington Post and Trains magazine, Dirt knew the touring schedule and would greet each tour as it arrived. He passed away in January 2023 and will be buried on the premises and honored by two bronze statues.
 George, resident pest controller at Stourbridge Junction railway station.
 Tama, a calico cat who was the station master at Kinokawa, Wakayama railway station, Wakayama Prefecture, Japan from 2007 to 2015.

Mascots
Cherry Pop, "Jovan Cherry Pop of Mystichill" (1981–1995), was a pedigree Champion Persian who became the poster cat for the Broward Country Humane Society. Money raised from Cherry Pop merchandise, events, and parties were donated to the Humane Society and other shelters, assisting in bringing attention to pet adoption for animals in need.
Matilda, resident cat of the Algonquin Hotel in New York City. The Algonquin was for many years home to the Algonquin Round Table, consisting of such American wits as Dorothy Parker, Alexander Woolcott, and Harpo Marx. There have been nine cats who have called the Algonquin their home since the 1930s, but not all have been female. All the males have been named Hamlet (in deference to the actor John Barrymore), and the females Matilda.
Şero, the political mascot of the Turkish Republican People's Party (CHP) who resides in the party's headquarters in Ankara.
Smudge, "employed" for many years at the People's Palace, Glasgow and a trade union member as a result.

Other
Artful Dodger, a cat in the United Kingdom, who in 2011 was reported to regularly catch the cross-town bus.
Bart, also known as zombie cat, a cat who survived a traffic accident, was unintentionally buried alive, and clawed its way out of the grave.
Beerbohm, a cat that resided at the Gielgud Theatre in London.
Big Boy, a University of California, Santa Barbara campus cat.
Blackie the Talking Cat, a "talking" cat who was exhibited (for donations) by an unemployed couple on the streets of Augusta, Georgia. Blackie became the subject of a court case, Miles v. City Council of Augusta.
Blue, a Siamese cat taken "hostage" in Gresham, Oregon in a grocery store in the United States in 1994.
Browser, a Texas library cat.
Brünnhilde, a cat dressed up like a Valkyrie. Considered by the Library of Congress to be one of its most beloved free-to-use photos.
CC (Copy Cat, or Carbon Cat), the first cloned cat.
Chase No Face, a cat who lost her face in an accident, and is now a therapy cat for people with disfigurements.
Colin, a resident cat who resides at the Exeter headquarters of Devon and Cornwall Police. 
Crimean Tom, a cat that helped British Army troops find food after the Siege of Sevastopol
Dusty the Klepto Kitty (US), notorious for being an expert night cat burglar.
Emily, an American cat who, after being lost, was found to have gone to France.
Faith, a London cat that took up residence in St Faith & St Augustine's church (by St Paul's Cathedral) in wartime, and received a PDSA Silver Medal for her bravery in caring for her kitten when the church was bombed.
Fred the Undercover Kitty, a cat famous for assisting the NYPD and Brooklyn District Attorney's Office in 2006.
Jack, a cat who was lost by American Airlines baggage handlers at John F Kennedy airport before Hurricane Irene. He was found later but was severely dehydrated and malnourished after his 61-day ordeal and was euthanized.
Ketzel, the tuxedo cat who won a prize for his piano composition in 1997.
Lewis, a cat who became infamous after being placed under house arrest.
Little Nicky, the first animal cloned for commercial reasons.
Macavity, the busdrivers' nickname of a British cat, white with different-coloured eyes, known for regularly catching the local bus by himself.
Marzipan (c.1992–2013), a calico cat who lived in the lobby of Astor Theatre in Melbourne, Australia. She was the theatre's unofficial mascot and was often seen sitting on the couches, waiting for the patrons to pat her as they left the cinema. She was also known to stroll in the cinema and watch the movies, or simply wander down the aisle and sit on patrons' laps. She had her own Facebook fan page.
Mike (1908 – January 1929), a cat who guarded the entrance to the British Museum.
Mittens (~2009–present), a ginger Turkish Angora who wanders Wellington, New Zealand, and has a Facebook-based fanbase who regularly posts photos of him climbing into rental cars, entering businesses, and napping in unusual places.
Nora, a gray tabby cat who plays the piano alongside her owner.
Oscar, a cat fitted with bionic hind legs following an accident in 2009.
Oscar the hospice cat, written up in the New England Journal of Medicine for his uncanny ability to predict which patients will die by curling up to sleep with them hours before their death. To date he has been right 100+ times.
 Panteleimon, (affectionately known as Pantyusha), a cat who lived in Kotik, a restaurant opposite the Golden Gate in Kyiv. A hospitable host, and a favorite of restaurant workers and visitors alike, he did not allow himself to rest until he checked whether everyone was comfortable at the table. According to an unconfirmed story a fire broke out in the restaurant and Panteleimon woke everyone up so they escaped their death but the cat itself died, suffocating in the smoke. In 1998 a monument to the animal was erected near the entrance to the same restaurant.
Peter, the Lord's cat, the only animal to have an obituary in Wisden Cricketers' Almanack.
Pickles, a cat who lives on the Hobbiton movie set in Matamata, New Zealand.
Red, a cat who became a millionaire in 2005.
Rolf, a University of Warwick campus cat.
Room 8, a tomcat who appeared at Elysian Heights Elementary School in Echo Park, California at the start of the school year in 1952, returning every day thereafter, before disappearing for the summer, only to return the following September. This behavior continued into the mid-1960s. (Ref. Los Angeles Times)
Rusik, the Russian police sniffer cat on Stavropol, who died in the line of duty fighting against illegal endangered sturgeon fish traffic in 2003.
Scarlett, who in 1996 saved her kittens one by one from a fire in Brooklyn NY, suffering horrible burns in the process. Named Scarlett by the fireman who rescued her. She became a famous example of the power of a mother's love.
 Senator Capitol Kitty, a resident of Capitol Park in Sacramento, CA and star of Sharon Davis's book "The Adventures of Capitol Kitty"
Sissi the Red Cat, an Italian cat who achieved celebrity by correctly picking the results of the 2014 World Cup matches in Brazil.
Tibs the Great (November 1950 – December 1964) was the British Post Office's "number one cat" and kept the post office headquarters completely mouse-free during his 14 years of service.
Tiddles, tabby resident of the Ladies' toilet at Paddington Station, London. Thousands of passengers met her and their donations fed her.
Tobermory Cat, a cat living in Tobermory, made famous by Angus Stewart.
Willow, a cat lost from a Boulder, Colorado home, who was discovered 5 years later and 1,800 miles away in New York City. She survived owls, coyotes, criminals, and Manhattan traffic. She was reunited with her owners with the help of her microchip.
Winnie, who awakened a New Castle, Indiana family in April 2007 at 1 a.m. after detecting carbon monoxide in their home, saving the family's lives.

Other pets of famous people 

 Baggage, a cat owned by British television presenter Gok Wan. Baggage was the inspiration for Gok's TV series Baggage, first broadcast in the UK on 21 September 2012. Has a limited following on Twitter and a fanpage on Facebook.
 Bimbo, the cat belonging to Makarios III during his British-imposed time in exile in the Seychelles.
Catarina, Edgar Allan Poe's pet cat and the inspiration for his story "The Black Cat".
 Cheddar, who belongs to the former Prime Minister of Canada Stephen Harper.
Choupette, the pet and muse of designer Karl Lagerfeld
 Delilah, belonging to the Queen frontman Freddie Mercury; Mercury paid tribute to Delilah, a female tortoiseshell cat, on the Queen album, Innuendo.
 F.D.C. Willard, the pen name of Chester, the cat of Jack H. Hetherington, who listed the cat as co-author of several physics papers from 1975 to 1980
 Foss, belonging to Edward Lear; subject of many drawings, some published in The Heraldic Blazon of Foss the Cat; inspired The Owl & the Pussycat; Lear buried Foss in his garden and died himself only two months later
 Jellylorum was T. S. Eliot's own cat, immortalized in Old Possum's Book of Practical Cats, the basis for the musical Cats
 Khouli-Khan, the cat of Thomas Anson is memorialized by the neoclassical "Cat's Monument" in the park at Shugborough Hall, Staffordshire, unless the cat in question is the first cat to circumnavigate the globe in the company of Admiral George Anson on 

  Mademoiselle Fifi, (aka Paree) the beloved pet cat of aviator John Moisant. Fifi often accompanied Moisant on his flights, and on 23 August 1910 Mademoiselle Fifi became the first cat to fly across the English Channel during the first aeroplane flight from London-to-Paris. Moisant was killed at New Orleans in December 1910, and a famous photo was published of Fifi attending Moisant's funeral, draped in mourning cover.
  Meredith Grey,  Olivia Benson, and  Benjamin Button, Scottish Folds and a Ragdoll belonging to Taylor Swift. Olivia Benson's worth was estimated to be $97 million in 2023, making her the third-richest pet in the world.
 Minna Minna Mowbray, belonging to Michael Joseph; an entire chapter is dedicated to her in Cat's Company 1946.
Mouschi, the tabby cat who lived in the Secret Annexe of Anne Frank's family; it was actually Peter van Pels (aka Peter Van Daan)'s cat.
 Mourka, belonging to George Balanchine and the subject of Mourka: the autobiography of a cat by Tanaquil LeClercq, Stein & Day, New York, 1964.
 Neo, the cat of author Jeff VanderMeer.
 Nigger Man, the cat owned by H. P. Lovecraft, often cited in discussions of Lovecraft's controversial racial attitudes. 
 Norton, a Scottish fold tabby belonging to Peter Gethers; memorialized in novels The Cat Who Went to Paris, A Cat Abroad, and The Cat Who'll Live Forever.
Ollie, the beloved Siamese cat of Ricky Gervais and Jane Fallon. Ollie was presented to Gervais by Jonathan Ross during the Friday Night with Jonathan Ross show on 14 November 2003. She was named after Oliver Hardy and had 62.8K Twitter followers at the time of her passing on 10 March 2020.
Pickle, full name Picklicious Fatkins the First, is the beloved tabby cat of Ricky Gervais and Jane Fallon. She was adopted by the couple in October 2020 and has more than 26K Twitter followers.
 Pixie, a Maine Coon belonging to well-known ailurophile Judge Richard Posner; described by Judge Posner in the Chicago Tribune as "the best cat [he's] ever had."
 Polar Bear, the white cat adopted by writer and animal activist Cleveland Amory, and featured in The Cat Who Came for Christmas, The Cat and the Curmudgeon, and The Best Cat Ever
 Rupi, belonging to Jethro Tull leader Ian Anderson; inspired title song of his 2004 solo album Rupi's Dance.
 Sadie, a Siamese belonging to James Mason; talked about in Mason's The Cats in our Lives (1949).
 Selima, a Tortoiseshell tabby belonging to Horace Walpole; drowned in a goldfish bowl, inspiring Thomas Gray's poem Ode on the Death of a Favourite Cat Drowned in a Tub of Goldfishes (1748).
 Shorty Blackwell, a cat that belonged to Micky Dolenz of The Monkees, and was the subject of a song written from the cat's point of view, called "Shorty Blackwell".
Snacks, belonging to Bethany Cosentino of Best Coast. Snacks was featured on the cover of the band's debut album Crazy for You, and Snacks and Cosentino were featured together in a PETA ad campaign.
Snowball, the most famous of Ernest Hemingway's cats, who was polydactyl and lived with Hemingway at his house in Key West.
 Solomon, one of Lloyd Alexander's many cats, who inspired the premise of the book Time Cat: The Remarkable Journeys of Jason And Gareth.
 Sprite, belonging to Bill Watterson, creator of Calvin and Hobbes; she was used as inspiration for some of Hobbes' physical features and behaviors, such as his habit of pouncing on Calvin.
 Taffy, belonging to Christopher Morley. Thieving cat commemorated in Morley's 1929 poem "In Honor of Taffy Topaz".

See also 

Acoustic Kitty
Cats and the Internet
Dickin Medal, recipients includes only one cat
List of animals awarded human credentials 
List of cat breeds
Lists of dogs
List of fictional cats
List of oldest cats
List of wealthiest animals

References